is a mountain range of Toyama Prefecture and Gifu Prefecture in Japan.

Main Mountain 
Mount Shiraki（1,586m）- Have wetland.
Mount Kongōdō（1,638m）- Have wetland.
Mount Ningyō（1,726m）-Have a natural snow painting of twin sisters.
Mount Sarugabanba（1,875m）-The highest peak of Hida Highlands

References

See also 
Gokayama
Hida Province
1586 Tenshō earthquake

Mountain ranges of Japan
Tourist attractions in Japan
Hida Province
Mountains of Toyama Prefecture
Highlands